Jamie Walters is the self-titled debut from American actor and singer, Jamie Walters. The album's first single "Hold On", reached number 16 on the Billboard Hot 100. It placed at number 52 on the Billboard Year-End Hot 100 singles of 1995 list. The album sold over one million copies and was certified platinum in the United States.

Critical reception

Sara Sytsma of AllMusic gave it three out of five stars and was given an "Album Pick" tag, calling it "a well-produced
collection of mainstream, adult contemporary-oriented pop/rock". But Sytsma commented that Walters "doesn't possess a great voice, but the producers of the album are quite talented; in their hands, he sounds very good."

Tour
Walters toured the US and Europe to support the album. The European leg of the tour featured performances that consisted of just Walters and Reb Beach on acoustic guitars.

When asked about this tour, Reb Beach answered:
"Jamie Walters was THE funnest tour I ever did. It was just Jamie and I, first class all the way through Europe. Jamie and I became great friends and we wrote the song "You" together. With the exception of Kip Winger, he is probably my favorite person in the world (meaning "male person")."

Track listing

Personnel
Adapted credits from the album's liner notes.

Vocals
Main vocals – Jamie Walters
Backing vocals – Alex Brown, Merry Clayton, Barry Coffing, Dr. John, Dee Harvey, Mortonette Jenkins, Marlena Jeter, David Palmer, Vonda Shepard, Jamie Walters, Zach Throne

Musicians
Bass guitar – John Pierce, Leland Sklar, Zach Throne
Drums – Russ Kunkel
Guitars – Michael Landau, Bob Mann, David Palmer, Dean Parks, Jamie Walters, Zach Throne
Hammond B3 – Mike Finnigan
Harmonica – Jamie Walters
Keyboards – Guy Moon, Kevin Savigar
Loops and sampling – Roy Campanella III
Percussion – Russ Kunkel, Gary Mallaber

Production
Album coordinators – Andy Forshee, Mark Heyes, Michael Knobloch
Assistant engineer – Michae Knobloch
Engineering – Grant Conway, David Hines, Max Norman, Michael Ross, Steve Tyrell, Gabe Veltri
Mastering – Gavin Lurssen, The Mastering Lab
Mixing – Chris Lord-Alge
Producer – Steve Tyrell
Production assistant – Julia Russell

Design
Art direction – Robin Cottle
Photography – Brad Hitz
Illustration – Charlie Roberts

Charts

Certifications

References

1994 debut albums
Jamie Walters albums
Atlantic Records albums